Sins of a Dark Age was a dark fantasy multiplayer online battle arena (MOBA) video game developed by Ironclad Games, and published by Ironclad Games and Steam for Microsoft Windows operating systems. The game launched as a free to play title on Steam on May 8, 2015. The game features a comprehensive storyline set in a dark fantasy world. Sins of a Dark Age ceased further development on June 30, 2015 due to not being sustainable with its current player base, and the servers were shut down on March 30, 2016.

See also
 Sins of a Solar Empire

References

External links
 

Fantasy video games
Games for Windows certified games
Multiplayer online battle arena games
Multiplayer video games
Real-time strategy video games
Video games developed in Canada
Cancelled Windows games